Hush, Hush is a 2009 New York Times bestselling young adult fantasy novel by Becca Fitzpatrick and the first book in her Hush, Hush series. The novel received rave reviews and focuses on Nora Grey, a teenager whose life is at risk after beginning a romance with new student Patch, a fallen angel with a dark connection to Nora.

Book rights to Hush, Hush have been sold to over 13 countries, with LD Entertainment purchasing film rights.

Plot
Nora Grey is an average sophomore student living in Coldwater, Maine. Her life is largely uneventful until she is seated next to a mysterious senior named Patch Cipriano in biology class, who had failed the subject several times before. The two are initially at odds, but Nora finds herself inexplicably drawn to him, his behavior both attractive and repelling. Despite the strong pull she feels towards him, Nora continues to tell her best friend Vee that she's not interested in Patch.

Vee later invites Nora to a local amusement park, Delphic, in an attempt to set her up with Elliot, a boy who has expressed an attraction to Nora. The trip turns awkward when the group runs into Patch, who makes Elliot jealous. Nora confronts Patch and he persuades Nora to meet him in front of the newly reformed roller coaster, the Archangel. Nora later makes an excuse to find something to eat and sets off to find Patch.

After she finds Patch, he manages to persuade her to ride the Archangel. The ride turns into a disaster after Nora falls from the roller coaster, only to realize it was her imagination. The incident leaves her shaken up. When Nora is unable to locate Vee and the others at the amusement park, she is left with no option but to allow Patch to drive her home. Once home, Patch offers to make tacos.  Nora becomes suspicious and worried as the knife he uses changes sizes. The two nearly kiss but are interrupted by her mom calling in an attempt to check on Nora.

Nora becomes increasingly more connected with Patch and begins to change her opinion of him, especially after meeting his closest and only friend Rixon. Meanwhile, she also begins to grow more curious and suspicious of Elliot after discovering his involvement in a murder case in his last school.

Nora becomes extremely afraid after a bag lady is murdered in front of her. She'd given the woman her coat and hat in exchange for directions. She calls Patch for a ride home due to the rain and her fear, but his Jeep breaks down partway through and the pair are forced to take shelter in a shabby motel. While in the room, Nora finds that Patch has an upside down V on his back, which she earlier thought was her imagination during a play fight between Rixon and Patch at Bo's Arcade. Fascinated by it, she manages to touch the scar and is pulled into his memories of his past. This prompts Patch to demand to know what she had seen, and Nora to demand answers about what she has seen. This leads to the revelation that Patch is actually a fallen angel from Heaven who was trying to kill her, and in doing so, gain a human body. Her death would kill his Nephilim vassal Chauncey Langeais and make Patch completely human. She also discovers that Patch has an ex-girlfriend named Dabria, who is also Nora's new counselor at school, an angel of death who wants Patch to save Nora's life so he can become a guardian angel and so he can get back together with her. Patch had initially discarded Dabria's idea out of a desire to become human, but the plan failed because he had fallen in love with Nora.

It is soon revealed that her friend Jules is actually Chauncey, who wants revenge on Patch for tricking him into swearing an oath that will allow Patch to take over his body during the Jewish month of Cheshvan. After leaving the motel and going home, Dabria breaks into Nora's room and says that she wants to kill Nora in order to prevent Patch from doing so and becoming human. Nora is narrowly saved by Patch, who goes after Dabria and strips her of her wings in vengeance, already knowing the archangels would have done the same for trying to kill Nora.

Nora is later invited to a game of hide-and-seek with Vee, Jules, and Elliot, with Elliot hinting that Vee will not survive the game if Nora doesn't participate. Despite Patch attempting to get her to remain behind in the car, Nora goes after them. She soon discovers Jules' unmoving body, presuming Elliot killed him, only to be cornered by Jules, who confesses that he was behind various attacks on her life as a way of getting revenge on Patch. The game continues as they are held at gunpoint by Jules.

Nora struggles with Jules while Patch tries to distract him, but this fails and Patch is forced to possess Nora's body to fight him. The process leaves Patch unconscious after he's separated from her body because it is not the month of Cheshvan. In an attempt to escape, Nora climbs to the rafters of the school gym, but Jules uses mind tricks to make her believe that the ladders are breaking and that she is going to fall to her death. Patch manages to break through the tricks by making her focus on his voice in her mind. Jules begins to climb the ladder after her, but Nora confronts him with the knowledge that if she were to sacrifice her life, Patch would become human and Jules would die. With this in mind, Nora throws herself from the rafters, which effectively kills Jules.

To her surprise, Nora wakes up alive and well. Patch explains that he did not take her sacrifice because there was no point in having a human body without her. In doing so, Patch has saved Nora's life and is now her guardian angel. The two share a romantic moment, ending the book.

Characters
Nora Grey
 Nora Grey is the main protagonist and narrator of Hush, Hush. Nora lives with her mother in the farmhouse in Coldwater, Maine, and attends Coldwater High School with her best friend Vee Sky. She is studious and diligent. Her father, Harrison Grey, was murdered a year ago. She meets Patch when Coach decides to have a new seat arrangement and becomes her new biology partner. At first, she is reluctant to have Patch as her partner but eventually becomes intrigued by him. She falls for him against her better judgment. Jules and Patch mention several times that she has a "weak mind"; this doesn't mean that she's weak-willed, but that it's extremely difficult for her to block out mind controllers.
 
Patch Cipriano
Patch Cipriano, a new senior at Coldwater High, is Nora's new biology partner. He is a powerful fallen angel who has a lot of enemies. He spends his time playing pool at Bo's Arcade. He didn't care for anything else other than becoming human until he meets Nora Grey. He keeps his past under wraps and is accused of telling more lies than truths from Nora, although he simply avoids the questions. He can be sly and brooding, and frequently leaves Nora alternately furious or tongue-tied. He uses his charms as a way of getting what he wants and avoiding unwanted questions, though he begins to open up as the novel progresses. Nora eventually learns he is a fallen angel, who fell when he loved a human girl and tried to be with her. After failing to take control of a human body, the avenging angels ripped Patch's wings off on his way back to heaven. He cannot feel physically — it is described as experiencing the world through a pane of glass — but he can experience emotions. When he is restored as a guardian angel, he regains the ability to fly, though he still cannot feel, as he has not yet "earned" that right. Later in the story his real name is revealed to be Jev.

Vee Sky
 Vee is Nora's best friend. Vee is described as a "green-eyed, minky blonde, and a few pounds over curvy". She is funny throughout the book, but can be a bit immature, especially about "S-E-X". She is also quick to judge people and will ignore facts if she doesn't like them. She is later attacked by a man in a ski mask, later revealed to be Dabria/Miss Greene. After the attack, she shows an extreme distrust in Patch, mistaking him for the attacker.

Elliot Saunders
 Elliot is a guy that Nora met at a shop. He originally flirted with and defended Nora at every opportunity. Nora later discovers that he is suspected of killing a girl, leaving her unsure of his true character. It is revealed that Jules is his benefactor as a scholar in Kinghorn Prep. Later on, Jules tests Elliot's loyalty by making him choose between his lover and his education, with Elliot ultimately giving in to Jules. He is revealed to be Jules' pawn in his plan on exacting revenge on Patch by hurting Nora. He is incapacitated by Jules in the school library while luring Nora into the trap. He is saved from dying after Vee calls the police.

Jules/Chauncey Langeais
Jules is dark and six-foot-ten with shoulder-length blond hair. He is revealed in the later part of the book to be Patch's vassal, Chauncey, who wants to have revenge on the fallen angel for tricking him into swearing an oath that will allow Patch to take control over his body for two weeks during the Jewish month of Cheshvan. He inherited the power to create illusions from his father, using it to frighten Nora numerous times in the book. He would also use Elliot as his pawn in his plan to hurt Patch. As a Nephilim, he is killed when Nora sacrificed herself by jumping off of the rafters. Patch explains that when Nora came back, Chauncey didn't have a soul to reanimate his body, successfully killing him for good. He is related to Nora through her father.

Marcie Millar
 Marcie is the easy and popular girl at Coldwater High School who has an ongoing grudge with Nora. Marcie and Nora have been enemies since middle school, when Marcie publicly displayed Nora's underwear and spray-painted 'whore' on her locker. The reasons for her hatred of Nora are unknown. Her dad is the owner of Coldwater's Toyota dealership and she lives in an affluent neighborhood. She tries to publicly humiliate Nora in any way possible.

Dabria/Miss Greene
 Dabria is an Angel of Death and Patch's former lover. She came down to the earth to find Patch who fell after trying to be with a human girl by becoming human himself. She wanted Patch to get back his wings by saving Nora from death and go back to her. She becomes the new psychologist at school in order to get close to Nora and Patch. She later attempts to kill Nora at one point to get him back, but is unsuccessful. Due to these deeds, she begins to fall, and Patch speeds up the process by ripping her already weakened wings off.

Sequels
Hush, Hush was followed by three books, Crescendo, Silence, and Finale. The novels were released consecutively each year, with Finale being announced as the final book in the series. The series was initially promoted as being a trilogy, but it was later announced that the series would comprise four books, thus being a tetralogy.

Adaptations

Film adaptation
On December 4, 2012 Entertainment Weekly revealed that the entire Hush, Hush series had been optioned by LD Entertainment as producer and distributor Paramount Pictures. LD Entertainment announced that they would be turning the books into a film series, with Greek creator Patrick Sean Smith set to write the screenplay for the first installment.

On July 8, 2014, Becca announced on her website that she has decided that now is not the right time to move forward with the Hush, Hush movie and did not renew the movie option with LD Entertainment.

On July 20, 2018, Becca posted an update stating that a Hush Hush movie would be headed to production 'very soon'. Liana Liberato was cast as Nora and Wolfgang Novogratz as Patch. BCDF Pictures, along with Kalahari Film & Media, announced that Kellie Cyrus would be directing the film - who is best known for directing The Vampire Diaries and The Originals, as well as an episode of the drama You from Greg Berlanti and Sera Gamble.

13 July 2021, Becca announced that Hush, Hush has been greenlit for a film by SpringHill Company and Genius Entertainment Partner. Production is set to start late 2021.

Graphic novel
In 2011 Sea Lion Books published the first volume in a proposed three-volume adaptation of Hush, Hush, the first book in the series. Artist Jennyson Rosero was stated to be drawing the series, with Fitzpatrick and Rosero using Fitzpatrick's blog to receive reader advice and criticism from preliminary sketches.

References

External links
 Author's website
 Hush. Hush at the publisher's website

2009 American novels
American young adult novels
Novels set in Maine
Young adult romance literature

pt:Hush